Tinapa, a Filipino term, is fish cooked or preserved through the process of smoking. It is a native delicacy in the Philippines and is often made from blackfin scad (Alepes melanoptera, known locally as galunggong), or from milkfish, which is locally known as bangus.

Though canned tinapa in tomato sauce is common and sold commercially throughout the country, it is also still produced and sold traditionally or prepared at home. Tinapa recipe mainly involves the process of washing the fish and putting it in brine for an extended amount of time (usually 5 – 6 hours), air drying and finally smoking the fish. The fish species which are commonly used for making tinapa could either be galunggong (scads) or bangus (milkfish). 
 

The term tinapa means "prepared by smoking". Tapa in Philippine languages originally meant fish or meat preserved by smoking. In the Spanish Philippines, it came to refer to meats (modern tapa) preserved by other means. It is derived from Proto-Malayo-Polynesian *tapa, which in turn is derived from Proto-Austronesian *Capa.

See also
Tortang sardinas
Daing
Odong

References

Philippine cuisine
Food preservation